Olusegun (sometimes spelled as Oluwasegun or its diminutive form, Segun) is a name of Yoruba origin for males, meaning "God is victorious".

Notable people with the name include:
Akinsola Olusegun Faluyi (born 1934), Nigerian engineer
Olusegun Obasanjo (born 1937), Nigerian military personnel and politician
Olufela Olusegun Oludotun Ransome-Kuti (1938–1997), better known as Fela Kuti, Nigerian musician and human rights activist
Olusegun Osoba (born 1939) Nigerian journalist and politician
Harold Olusegun Demuren (born 1945), Nigerian engineer
Leo Segun Ajiborisha, Nigerian military general
Olusegun Adewoye (1947–2015), Nigerian engineer and academic
Olusegun Agagu (1948–2013), Nigerian politician
Patrick Olusegun Odegbami (born 1952), Nigerian footballer
Olusegun Oni (born 1954), Nigerian politician
Olusegun Mimiko (born 1954), Nigerian politician
Olusegun Olutoyin Aganga (born 1955), Nigerian politician
Olufemi Olusegun Pedro (born 1955), Nigerian politician
Olusegun Oluwatimi (born 1999), American football player
Henry Olusegun Adeola Samuel, (born, 1963), British singer
Olusegun Awolowo, (born 1963), Nigerian Lawyer
Olusegun Arinze, (born, 1965), Nigerian actor
Oluwasegun Abiodun, (born 1984), Nigerian footballer
Oluwasegun Makinde, (born 1991), Nigerian-Canadian athlete
For people not in the list, see:

References

Yoruba given names
African masculine given names